Hoseynabad-e Nazem (also Romanized as  Ḩoseynābād-e Nāz̧em and Hoseīn Abad Nazem; also known as Ḩoseynābād and Hūsaīnābād) is a village in Haram Rud-e Sofla Rural District, Samen District, Malayer County, Hamadan Province, Iran. At the 2006 census, its population was 3,326, in 869 families.

References 

Populated places in Malayer County